Punta Sulè (in Piedmontese Ponta Solé) is a 3,384 m a.s.l.mountain of the Graian Alps, located in Italy.

Geography 

The mountain is the highest elevation of the ridge between the terminal dales of the Stura di Viù valley, Peraciaval (North) and Malciaussia (South). Going NW the Sulè pass divides Punta Sulè from Testa Sulà (3,073 m a.s.l.), while going East the Colletto della Lera (3,320 m a.s.l.) separates it from Monte Lera.

Administratively the mountain belongs to the Usseglio municipality (comune).

On the summit a cairn bears a small Jesus Christ statue; on another nearby cairn is located a lightning rod. In clear days it offers a good view of many important mountains of Western Alps including Argentera group, Viso, Dauphiné Alps, Bianco, Gran Paradiso and Rosa.

SOIUSA classification 
According to the SOIUSA (International Standardized Mountain Subdivision of the Alps) the mountain can be classified in the following way:
 main part = Western Alps
 major sector = North Western Alps
 section = Graian Alps
 subsection = South-Eastern Graian Alps
 supergroup = Catena Arnas-Ciamarella 
 group = Gruppo Autaret-Ovarda
 subgroup = Cresta Autaret-Lera-Arnas
 code = I/B-7.I-B.4.a

History 
The first recorded ascent to Punta Sulè was carried out by Filippo Vallino on August 16, 1880.

Access to the summit 
The usual route to Punta Sulè starts from lago di Malciaussia and, after Pian Sulè, reaches the summit following the SW ridge of the mountain. While long (around 1,600 metres of vertical drop) this route does not require alpinistic skills but just scrambling. In the Italian scale of hiking difficulty is rated EE (Escursionisti Esperti, namely suitable for expert hikers). Traverse from Punta Sulè to Monte Lera is considered an alpinistic route, evaluated of PD grade.

References

Maps

 Istituto Geografico Militare (IGM) official maps of Italy, 1:25.000 and 1:100.000 scale, on-line version
 Istituto Geografico Centrale (IGC) - Carta dei sentieri e dei rifugi scala 1:50.000 n. 2 Valli di Lanzo e Moncenisio
 Istituto Geografico Centrale - Carta dei sentieri e dei rifugi scala 1:25.000 n.110 Alte Valli di Lanzo (Rocciamelone - Uja di Ciamarella - Le Levanne)

Alpine three-thousanders
Mountains of the Graian Alps
Mountains of Piedmont